Fred Backway (2 October 1913 – 28 March 1995) was a former Australian rules footballer who played with South Melbourne, Melbourne and Fitzroy in the Victorian Football League (VFL).

Notes

External links 

1913 births
Australian rules footballers from Victoria (Australia)
Sydney Swans players
Melbourne Football Club players
Fitzroy Football Club players
1995 deaths
People from Maryborough, Victoria